Perfect Couple (Chinese: 金玉良缘) is a 2014 Chinese television series starring Wallace Huo and Tiffany Tang. This is the first television series produced by Wallace Huo's Huaje Studio. Filming started in April 2013, and ended in July 2013. The series started aired on Jiangsu TV and Shenzhen TV from 21 April to 7 May 2014.

Synopsis
During the Ming Dynasty, Yu Qi Ling (Tiffany Tang) heads to the capital with only her adoptive mother's belongings to find her mother's biological son. She encounters Jin Yuan Bao (Wallace Huo), a rich young master who works at the Detective Bureau and was on a case of capturing a man - the thief that Yu Qi Ling was chasing. It turns out that the thief was part of a kidnapping ring, and it led the protagonists to the Thousand Beauties Chamber where Chu Chu, the supposed leader was.

Meanwhile, the Empress Dowager has bestowed a marriage between Jin Yuan Bao and Jiang Xiao Xuan to prevent the Second Prince from usurping the throne from the Crowned Prince. When Jin Yuan Bao's intended bride runs away before the night of the wedding, Yu Qi Ling assumes Jiang Xiao Xuan's identity and marries into the Jin family.

Upon realizing that Jin Yuan Bao was indeed her adoptive mother's biological son, she schemes to reunite him with her mother. However, she runs into many obstacles as she cannot reveal that she and Jiang Xiao Xuan had switched identities. This leads to many misunderstandings and many quarrels between Jin Yuan Bao and Yu Qi Ling.

At the same time, Jin Yuan Bao's cousin, Liu Wen Chao, plans multiple assassination attempts on Jin Yuan Bao's life because he has desires of rising up and owning the Jin Manor and was conspiring with the Second Prince. He strangles Jiang Xiao Xuan's maid, Xi Er, to death because she found out about their scheming during Madam Jin's birthday. He plants his own spies in the Bureau of Weaponry so he would one day take control once he gets rid of Jin Yuan Bao. He desires Yu Qi Ling although she was his cousin's wife. Eventually, he finds out about the identity switch between Yu Qi Ling and Jiang Xiao Xuan and Jin Yuan Bao's true origins and made use of this to torture the protagonists and their families.

When the Empress Dowager learns that the Jin family and Yu Qi Ling has committed lese-majesty, she jails them. However, she knows that the Second Prince and Liu Wen Chao were in cahoots so she had Jin Yuan Bao investigate the truth. With the truth and evidence, the two villains did not stand a chance.

Cast

Main

Supporting

Soundtrack

Ratings 

 Highest ratings are marked in red, lowest ratings are marked in blue

Awards and nominations

International broadcast

References

External links
 Perfect Couple at the Internet Movie Database

Chinese romantic comedy television series
2014 Chinese television series debuts
Jiangsu Television original programming
2014 Chinese television series endings